Henry Alexander Connor (December 3, 1904 – March 2, 1947) was a Canadian ice hockey forward who played 135 games in the National Hockey League between 1927 and 1931. Connor played for the Ottawa Senators, Boston Bruins, and New York Americans. Connor was born in Ottawa, Ontario.

Career statistics

Regular season and playoffs

External links
 

1904 births
1947 deaths
Boston Bruins players
Canadian ice hockey forwards
Guelph Royals players
Ice hockey people from Ottawa
London Tecumsehs players
New York Americans players
Ontario Hockey Association Senior A League (1890–1979) players
Ottawa Senators (1917) players
Providence Reds players
Quebec Castors players
Saskatoon Sheiks players